Salada tea is a Canadian brand of tea currently sold in Canada by Unilever and in the United States by Salada Foods, a division of Redco Foods, Inc.

History 
The Salada tea business was founded in Toronto in 1892 by Montreal-born businessman Peter Charles Larkin. His main innovation was to replace tea sold loose from tea chests with a product packaged in foil. This helped establish a uniform flavor for Salada and the promise of consistent freshness to its drinkers. It became one of the leading teas in Canada and the northeastern United States.

By 1917, Salada tea was so popular in the United States that Larkin's company (the Salada Tea Company Limited) was able to establish a U.S. headquarters, blending and packaging plant at 330 Stuart Street in Boston, Massachusetts. Designed by architects Densmore and LeClear, the building featured large bronze doors by Henry Wilson inscribed with images of the history of the Ceylon tea trade, as well as Larkin's own contributions to a commitment to quality in the field. Although the building has changed hands several times, the doors are still there.

By the 1950s, Salada had established plants across North America. In 1957, the company was acquired by Shirriff-Horsey. From 1969 to 1988, it was owned in Canada by Kellogg Canada.

In 1988, Salada was acquired by Redco Foods, Inc., a company formed to produce Red Rose Tea in the U.S. under license from Unilever. Not long thereafter, Redco Foods sold Salada (Canada) to Unilever, so that each company produced both brands in their respective country. Since 1995, Redco Foods has been owned by Teekanne of Germany.

Since 2018, Salada-branded tea in the U.S. has been produced under license by Harris Tea Company. The Salada brand in the U.S. is still owned by Redco Foods, while Salada tea in Canada is a brand of Unilever Canada.

References

External links 

Salada website (U.S.)
Salada website (Canada)

Tea brands
Food and drink companies established in 1892
Companies based in Toronto
Companies based in Boston
Food and drink companies based in New York (state)
1892 establishments in Ontario